Jacob Needleman (October 6, 1934 - November 28, 2022) was an American philosopher, author, and religious scholar.

Needleman was Jewish and was educated at Harvard University, Yale University, and the University of Freiburg, Germany. He was deeply involved in the Gurdjieff Work and the Gurdjieff Foundation of San Francisco. He was a Professor Emeritus of Philosophy and Religion at San Francisco State University and is said to have "popularized the term 'new religious movements'." He was a former visiting professor at the Duxx Graduate School of Business Leadership in Monterrey, Mexico, and former director of the Center for the study of New Religions at the Graduate Theological Union in Berkeley, California. He has also served as a research associate at the Rockefeller Institute for Medical Research, a research fellow at Union Theological Seminary, Adjunct Professor of Medical Ethics at the University of California Medical School and guest Professor of Religious Studies at the Sorbonne, Paris (1992). Needleman was honored by the New York Open Center in New York City in 2006.  Needleman also narrated classical religious texts in audiobook format, including the Taoist Tao Te Ching and the Hindu Bhagavad Gita.

Commentary

On being a philosopher 
In Talks at Google in 2007, Needleman said, "A philosopher deals with the great unanswerable questions, which I think have answers, but not usually in the state of being that we're asking them. In other words, these great questions that wake us up in the middle of the night about: Why are we here? What's the meaning of it all? Questions that some people make fun of. These questions are some of the kinds of questions that sometimes the mind can ask, but the mind alone cannot answer. And since we are a culture that has gravitated toward, the center of gravity of most of our personalities, is the intellect, these questions seem to be intrinsically unanswerable and the response to these questions has to be not just in words or in interesting insights, but in the movement down from the mind to make contact with the heart and the body, which, when they work together, are like another intelligence. So that is what I think the true Philosopher tries to open to - that part which can respond to these [questions] and actually live what we are speaking about."

On democracy 
In a 2012 On Being interview with Krista Tipett, Needleman said, "A democratic citizen is not a citizen who can do anything he wants; it’s a citizen who has an obligation at the same time. And just to give you an example, if I may, the freedom of speech, what is the duty associated with it? Well, if you ponder that a little bit, you’ll come to the conclusion very clearly that the right of free speech implies the duty of allowing others to speak. If I have the right to speak, I have the duty to let you speak.

Now, that’s not so simple. It doesn’t mean just to stop my talking and wait till you’re finished and then come in and get you. It means I have an obligation inwardly — and that’s what we’re speaking about, is the inner dimension. Inwardly, I have to work at listening to you. That means I don’t have to agree with you, but I have to let your thought into my mind in order to have a real democratic exchange between us. And that is a very interesting work of the human being, don’t you think?"

On money 
In a 1990 A World of Ideas Interview with Bill Moyers, Needleman said, "There's always been greed, there's always been avarice. There's always been a problem with people wanting more than they need. That's caused more problems for the human race than almost anything else. But cultures have always wanted other things, too. They've wanted honor. They've wanted power. Love. Respect. Beauty. It's hard to say now, though, that our culture wants anything else as much as it wants. money."

On the Gurdjieff teachings 
Needleman spoke often of Gurdjieff and his teaching.

In a 1991 interview with Gnosis magazine, Needleman said, "What Gurdjieff offers is a world view—the idea of an organic universe, a conscious universe, a universe with a purpose. The Gurdjieff teaching said life is a fundamental property of reality, and there is a movement toward consciousness and away from consciousness. There is a ladder of energies going up and down, and everything is included in that in some grand purpose. I found this very reasonable. Later scientific discoveries have more or less confirmed that there’s more livingness in the universe than was thought thirty or forty years ago."

Decades later, in a 2016 interview with Commonweal, Needleman said, "What does humanity serve? The human being is meant to serve, is here on earth, according to Gurdjieff’s teaching, to serve other human beings, to serve the earth, and to serve a certain function in the universe. That means, practically speaking we are built to serve, we are built to be able to love."

Writing 
Needleman authored articles, interviewed and wrote 24 books in a writing career that began in 1970.

Bibliography 
The New Religions (1970)
A Sense of the Cosmos: The Encounter of Modern Science and Ancient Truth (1975)
Sacred Tradition & Present Need (edited by Jacob Needleman and Dennis Lewis) (1975)
On the Way to Self Knowledge (edited by Jacob Needleman and Dennis Lewis) (1976)
Speaking of My Life: The Art of Living in the Cultural Revolution (1979)
Lost Christianity: A Journey of Rediscovery to the Centre of Christian Experience (1980)
The Heart of Philosophy (1982)
The Way of the Physician (1985)
Sword of Gnosis: Metaphysics, Cosmology, Tradition (1988)Sorcerers: A Novel (1988)Real Philosophy: An Anthology of the Universal Search for Meaning (introduction and commentary by Jacob Needleman and David Appelbaum) (1990)Money and the Meaning of Life (1991)Modern Esoteric Spirituality (edited by Jacob Needleman and Antoine Faivre) (1992)Eros (1995)A Little Book On Love (1996)Time and the Soul: Where has all the Meaningful Time Gone - And Can We Get it Back? (1998)The American Soul: Rediscovering the Wisdom of the Founders (2003)The Wisdom of Love: Toward a Shared Inner Search (previously published as A Little Book on Love) (2005)Why Can't We Be Good? (2008)What is God? (2009)Introduction to the Gurdjieff Work (2009)An Unknown World: Notes on the Meaning of the Earth (2012)Necessary Wisdom: Jacob Needleman talks about God, time, money, love, and the need for philosophy, in conversations with D. Patrick Miller. (2013)I am Not I'' (2016)

References

External links
 Official website
 Sun magazine article
 SF Gate article

1934 births
20th-century American philosophers
21st-century American philosophers
American spiritual writers
20th-century American Jews
Jewish philosophers
Harvard University alumni
San Francisco State University faculty
Yale University alumni
21st-century American Jews
Traditionalist School
Students of George Gurdjieff